Toni von Bukovics (1882–1970) was an Austrian stage and film actress.

Filmography

References

Bibliography
 Fox, Jo. Film Propaganda in Britain and Nazi Germany: World War II Cinema. Bloomsbury Academic, 2007.

External links

1882 births
1970 deaths
Austrian film actresses
20th-century Austrian actresses
Austrian stage actresses
Actresses from Budapest